Katchen is a surname. Notable people with the surname include:

Jon Katchen (born 1975), American lawyer
Julius Katchen (1926–1969), American concert pianist

See also
Kitchen (surname)